Siproeta stelenes (malachite) is a Neotropical brush-footed butterfly (family Nymphalidae). The malachite has large wings that are black and brilliant green or yellow-green on the upperside and light brown and olive green on the underside. It is named for the mineral malachite, which is similar in color to the bright green on the butterfly's wings. The malachite is found throughout Central and northern South America, where it is one of the most common butterfly species. Its distribution extends as far north as southern Texas and the tip of Florida, to Cuba as subspecies S. s. insularis (Holland, 1916), and S. s. biplagiata, and south to Brazil.

Adults feed on flower nectar, rotting fruit, dead animals, and bat dung. Females lay eggs on the new leaves of plants in the family Acanthaceae, especially ruellia. The larvae are horned, spiny, black caterpillars with red markings, The pupa stage is green and have sharp, gold spines that can puncture predators.

Malachites often are confused with Philaethria dido. They have similar coloration, but their wing shapes are different.

References

External links

Malachite fact sheet
The Butterfly Project: Siproeta stelenes

stelenes
Butterflies described in 1758
Butterflies of Central America
Fauna of Cuba
Butterflies of North America
Fauna of the Rio Grande valleys
Nymphalidae of South America
Taxa named by Carl Linnaeus